The 1946 Coupe de France Final was a football match held at Stade Olympique Yves-du-Manoir, Colombes on 26 May 1946, that saw Lille OSC defeat Red Star OA 4–2 thanks to goals by Bolek Tempowski, René Bihel and Roger Vandooren (2).

Match details

See also
Coupe de France 1945-1946

External links
Coupe de France results at Rec.Sport.Soccer Statistics Foundation
Report on French federation site

1946
Coupe De France Final 1946
Coupe De France Final 1946
Coupe
Sport in Hauts-de-Seine
Coupe de France Final
Coupe de France Final